Holtzmann is a surname. Notable people with the surname include:

 Adelheid Holtzmann (1866–1925), German politician and women's rights activist
 Adolf Holtzmann (1810–1870), German philologist
 Fanny E. Holtzmann (1902–1980), pioneering female lawyer
 Heinrich Julius Holtzmann (1832–1910), German theologian

ee also
 Holtzmann's law

German-language surnames
Occupational surnames